Brorupgaard is a manor house and estate situated close to Slagelse in Denmark. It was owned by Ludvig Holberg from 1840 until 1754. The current main building was constructed by August Willads Bech in 1856 and the estate has remained in the hands of the Bech family since then.

History
Brorupgaard is first mentioned as a manor in the Middle Ages and was then owned by the Bishops of Roskilde and operated as a fief. In 1454, it was ceded to Antvorskov Abbey in exchange for other land. After being confiscated by the Crown in connection with the Reformation, it seems to have been reduced to a simple tenant farm.

In 1674, Christian V presented the land to Poul Nielsen. After starting in an insignificant position at the royal court, Nielsen had managed to work his way up through the ranks, culminating with his ennoblement under the name Rosenpalme in 1784. In 1679, he was granted the right to reestablish a manor at the site, naming it Brorupgaard after the earlier estate in the site. He later increased the size of the estate through the acquisition of more land. On his death in 1688, he left his widow in rather difficult economic circumstances. In 1708, she ceded Brorupgaard to their son Andreas Rosenpalm. A naval officer, he served in the Great Northern War.

By 1712, Andreas Rosenving had sold the estate to Berte Skeel. In 1714, she sold it in public auction. The new owner was Johan Severin Benzon. He was also the owner of a number of other estates, including Estvadgaard in Jutland.

In 1735, he took a loan from Ludvig Holberg. Holberg, who was already the owner of nearby Tersløsegaard, became the new owner of Brorupgaard in 1740. He significantly increased the size of the estate through the acquisition of new tenant farms in the area. In 1845, Holberg more than doubled his holdings in the area with the purchase of nearby Tersløsegaard.

Being both unmarried and childless, he agreed to leave his estates, library and most of his fortune to the academy. The agreement with the king included that Holberg earned the title of Baron of Holberg. This meant that he would be free of taxes from any income from his estate's time. The new Sorø Academy was inaugurated on 26 July 1749.

In 1805, Sorø Academy sold Brorupgaard to Mads Jensen Westergaard. The next owner was Heinrich Vorbeck (17981881), who was originally from Bothmer in Mecklenburg-Schwerin. In 1840, he sold out to Lauritz Christophersen Worsøe (17901862).

 
Brorupgaard was once again struck by fire in 1855. The estate was the same year sold to August Willads Bech. He operated a modern dairy on his estate. He was also a pioneer in the cultivation of root crops. In 1856, he increased his holdings with the acquisitions of Moselund in Engesvang at Silkeborg. He planted forest on most of the estate.

Bech was married to Margrethe Rothe, daughter of Counter Admiral Carl Adolph Rothe. On Bech's death in 1877, she took over Brorupgaard while Valbygaard passed to their eldest son, Peter Kørgen Bech.

Architecture
The current main building was constructed by August Willads Bech in 1846.

List of owners
 (–1454) Roskildebispen
 (1454–1536) Antvorskov Abbey
 (1536–1674) The Crown
 (1674–1688) Poul Nilesen
 (1688–1708) Anne Nilesen, née Anderdatter
 (1708–1712) Anders Rosenpalm
 (1712–1714) Berte Skeel
 (1714–1740) Johan Severin Benzon
 (1740–1754) Ludvig Holberg
 (1754–1805) Sorø Academy
 (1805–) Mads Jensen Westtergaard
 (–1840) Heinrich von Vorbech
 (1840–1855) Lauritz Christopher Worsøe
 (1855–1877) August Willads Bech
 (1877–1886) Margrethe Bech
 (1886–) Bech family
 (2006–) Jørgen Peter Bech

References

Further reading
 Olrik, H.G.: Brorupgaard i Ludvig Holbergs Eje. 1946.

External links
 Official website

Manor houses in Slagelse Municipality